Ody Cleon Abbott (September 5, 1888 – April 13, 1933) was a major league outfielder for the St. Louis Cardinals for one year in . He attended the California State Normal School and Washington & Jefferson College.

He had a rather disappointing season, batting only .186 and striking out 20 out of 70 times. He played from September to October of that year.

He fought in World War I in the Army during 1918.

References

External links

1888 births
1933 deaths
People from Washington County, Pennsylvania
Major League Baseball outfielders
St. Louis Cardinals players
Baseball players from Pennsylvania
New Castle Nocks players
Charleroi (minor league baseball) players
Braddock Infants players
California Vulcans baseball players
Washington & Jefferson Presidents baseball players
New Castle Alliance players
Tacoma Tigers players
Oakland Oaks (baseball) players
Regina Red Sox players
United States Army personnel of World War I